= Liladewa =

Liladewa is a village in Uttar Pradesh, India.
